Kelvingrove Art Gallery and Museum is a museum and art gallery in Glasgow, Scotland.  It reopened in 2006 after a three-year refurbishment and since then has been one of Scotland's most popular visitor attractions. The museum has 22 galleries, housing a range of exhibits, including Renaissance art, taxidermy, and artefacts from ancient Egypt.

Location

The gallery is located on Argyle Street, in the West End of the city, on the banks of the River Kelvin (opposite the architecturally similar Kelvin Hall, which was built in matching style in the 1920s, after the previous hall had been destroyed by fire). It is adjacent to Kelvingrove Park and is near the main campus of the University of Glasgow on Gilmorehill.

Original museum
The original Kelvingrove Museum opened in 1876. It was housed in a much enlarged 18th-century mansion called Kelvingrove House, to the north-east of the current site, that was originally the home of Lord Provost Patrick Colquhoun.

Creation (1888–1901)

The construction of Kelvingrove was partly financed by the proceeds of the 1888 International Exhibition held in Kelvingrove Park. The gallery was designed by Sir John W. Simpson and E.J. Milner Allen, and opened in 1901 as the Palace of Fine Arts for the Glasgow International Exhibition held in that year. It is built in a Spanish Baroque style, follows the Glaswegian tradition of using Locharbriggs red sandstone, and includes an entire program of architectural sculpture by George Frampton, William Shirreffs, Francis Derwent Wood and other sculptors.

The centrepiece of the Centre Hall is a concert pipe organ constructed and installed by Lewis & Co. The organ was originally commissioned as part of the Glasgow International Exhibition, held in Kelvingrove Park in 1901. The organ was installed in the concert hall of the exhibition, which was capable of seating 3,000 people. The Centre Hall of the then newly completed Art Gallery and Museum was intended from the beginning to be a space in which to hold concerts. When the 1901 exhibition ended, a Councillor urged the Glasgow Corporation (now Glasgow Council) to purchase the organ, stating that without it, "the art gallery would be a body without a soul".  Purchase price and installation costs were met from the surplus exhibition proceeds, and the organ was installed in the Centre Hall by Lewis and Co. The present case front in walnut with non-functional display pipes was commissioned at this time from John W. Simpson. Simpson was the senior partner of Simpson & Milner Allen, architects of the gallery building.

There is an urban myth in Glasgow that the building was accidentally built back-to-front, and the architect jumped from one of the towers in despair upon realising his mistake. In reality, the grand entrance was always intended to face into Kelvingrove Park.

Refurbishment (2003–06)

Kelvingrove was reopened by Queen Elizabeth II on 11 July 2006 after a three-year closure for major refurbishment and restoration. The work, which cost around £35million, was one-third funded by the Heritage Lottery Fund and one-third by public donations to the appeal and included a new restaurant and a large basement extension to its display space to accommodate the 8,000 exhibits now on display. A new layout and wayfinding scheme was introduced to make the building more visitor-friendly, which was designed and executed by London-based museum design company, Event Communications. Immediately after its 2003–06 refurbishment, the museum was the most popular free-to-enter visitor attraction in Scotland, recording 2.23million visitors in 2007. These numbers made it the most visited museum in the United Kingdom outside London that year. From 2006 to 2009 the museum had 5 million visitors.

Collections
The museum's collections came mainly from the original Kelvingrove Museum and the McLellan Galleries. It has one of the finest collections of arms and armour in the world and a vast natural history collection. The art collection includes many outstanding European artworks, including works by the Old Masters (Vecellio's Madonna and Child with Saint Jerome and Saint Dorothy, Rembrandt van Rijn, Gerard de Lairesse, and Jozef Israëls), French Impressionists (such as Claude Monet, Pierre-Auguste Renoir, Camille Pissarro, Vincent van Gogh and Mary Cassatt), Dutch Renaissance, Scottish Colourists and exponents of the Glasgow School.

The museum houses Christ of Saint John of the Cross by Salvador Dalí. The copyright of this painting was bought by the curator at the time after a meeting with Dalí. Between 1993 and 2006, the painting was moved to the St Mungo Museum of Religious Life and Art.

The museum also contains a large gift of the decorative arts from Anne Hull Grundy, an art collector and philanthropist, covering the history of European jewellery in the 18th and 19th centuries.

Gallery

References

External links

 Museum website

Art museums established in 1901
Art museums and galleries in Glasgow
Category A listed buildings in Glasgow
Museums in Glasgow
Edwardian architecture
Spanish Baroque architecture
Natural history museums in Scotland
History museums in Scotland
Egyptological collections in Scotland
Decorative arts museums in Scotland
Sandstone buildings
1901 establishments in Scotland
Listed museum buildings in Scotland
Geology museums in Scotland
World's fair architecture in Glasgow